The Magwayen Creative Scholars' Guild (or, simply Magwayen) is the premiere theater organization of the Pamantasan ng Lungsod ng Maynila. It is the first organization in PLM to stage a full-length original musical play - Bidasari (1999), the first group to organize a literary contest - Gawad Magwayen (1998), and the first performing arts ensemble to hold a major concert - Incunabula (2000).

Founded in 1998 by Marlon Miguel, an award-winning screenplay writer, the organization already produced more than 10 major plays and many minor plays and other productions.

The Magwayen Name
The name Magwayen was derived from the Philippine history books. She is the Visayan deity for the otherworld, inspiring present-day scholars to conquer the world of the stage, literature and performing arts.

'Magwayen' temporarily changed its name to 'Marulaya' on its 12th anniversary . But it reverted back to "Magwayen" the following year.

Divisions

The Dramatics Ensemble
Throughout the years, Magwayen has been renowned for producing original stage productions, from the epic musicals Bidasari, Indrapura, Ang Prinsepe ng Marulaya, and comedy Señorita Pretenciosa, to the darker dramas Casa Ligaya and Trajedia La Vida.

On September 20, 2007, Magwayen staged its boldest and most daring play to date, X (Eks) at the Tangahalang Manileño of the PLM. The said stage production is composed of ten short plays, a conglomeration of different artistic visions of various award-winning and talented directors, that depict the different facets of the Philippine society.

Performing Arts Group

Magwayen is proud of its performing arts division, which consist of the Voice Department and Dance Department. It is known for creating edgy and riveting production numbers. It has produced concerts featuring the University's home grown talents. The legendary Incunabula, jam-packed MMI, the celebrated Chill out at WOW and the Artist Fest 2006 were among the notable student concerts produced by the guild.

The Literary and Production Division
Magwayen takes pride for writing and mounting original productions. Students found a new way of speaking their hearts and soul through a variety of literary masterpieces. Some of their productions are Bidasari, Señorita Pretenciosa, Hawla, Tatlong Mukha, Ang Principe ng Marulaya, Live Act (comedy anthology, now with its 3rd installment), Indrapura, and many more.

List of Magwayen Directors

Aside from Marlon Miguel, Jerald Napoles, and Real Florido, Magwayen is home to talented and award-winning directors. In 2007, the following directors together with Real Florido collaborated to create a stageplay entitled Eks (X).

 Michael Louis Flororita was the President of Magwayen Creative Scholars' Guild. He represented Magwayen in the President's Committee on Culture and Arts during his term. Michael is now working at an Events Agency under the Department of Trade and Industry and still continues to be Magwayen's acting coach. He directed Tisoy in Eks (X).
 Joan Jelica Lopez-Flores is a poet, musician, graphic artist and an aspiring filmmaker. Her short film Respite won a special award in Gawad CCP' Para Sa Alternatibong Pelikula at Bidyo in 2004. Sibuyas, another short film she made, and her documentary Asyenda were finalists to the 2005 Catholic Mass Media Awards. She wrote and composed all the songs in the comedy-musical Saan Nagtatago Si Happiness?, finalist to the 2nd Cinemalaya Indie Film Fest. She also worked for ABS-CBN Concept Development Group in 2005. Joan is currently employed in advertising agency Beginnings Communications Inc. as Copywriter. She directed Clemency with Renneth Moldes.
 Renneth Moldes is the former vice-president for Literary and Productions Division of Magwayen from 2000 to 2002. She was the Technical Director of the guild's concerts from 1999 to 2002. She helped wrote in 2006 the controversial stageplay on homosexuality, Tatlong Mukha. She is now working at an Events Agency under the Department of Trade and Industry. She co-directed Clemency with Joan Jelica Lopez-Flores.
 Carlo Angelo Yanesa has been the resident musical director for Magwayen stage productions and concerts. He directed 19sUmtHnG, Magwayen's musical romance offering in 2003. Carlo is currently working as musical coordinator, for ABS-CBN's Sunday variety show, ASAP, and part-time vocal coach for ABS-CBN artists. He directed Kape in Eks (X).
 Vidal Condicion is a scholar of the Center for Arts, Inc., where he showcased his singing and acting prowess in an array of musicale performances held at the Music Museum. He also played one of the major characters in Magwayen's Walang Umaga sa Casa Ligaya. He directed Eks (X).
 Vanessa Ann Singh is a former vice-president for the Performing Arts Division of Magwayen Creative Scholars' Guild. She has experience in professional theater, being part of Nick Joaquin's Portrait of the Artist as Filipino. Vanessa also took part in the guild's 1st musical Bidasari in 1999 and 2000. She is now performing around Asia as the lead vocalist of Fast Track Band. She directed Byaning in Eks (X).
 John Borgy Danao started in Magwayen at the age of 15. He organized parties in the club scene and worked with local and international DJs like DJ Manolet Dario, RuPaul, White Party Armsterdam and Salvation London DJs, Air Dance, Ragin' Divas, and May Bayot. His independent animated film was given honorable mention by Gawad CCP in 2003. He was part of the creative brainstorming group of GMA-7's Zaido. He directed Ama Namin in Eks (X).
 Franco Monticod is a former vice-president of Magwayen (2003–2004) and a graduate of Bachelor in Mass Communication. He is a freelance assistant director for music videos, TVCs, films and TV productions. His filmography include Mulawin the Movie, Eternity, La Visa Loca, ICU BED #7 (Cinemalaya 2005 entry) and Saan Nagtatago si Happiness? (Cinemalaya 2006 entry), ABS-CBN's Maalaala Mo Kaya, Sa Piling Mo, Maria Flor de Luna and Ysabella. He also worked as a brainstormer of GMA-7's teleserye Impostora and Kamandag. He directed Kompro in Eks (X).
 Byron Joseph Barinuevo is a former President of Magwayen (2006–2007). He directed Ang Prinsipe ng Marulaya in 2005. He also bagged major roles for stage plays Indrapura (2006), Tatlong Mukha (2006), Ang Prinsipe ng Marulaya (2005), 19Sumthing (2004),  Trahedya dela Vida (2003), and Walang Umaga sa Casa Ligaya (2002). He is currently working as a project coordinator for Mowelfund Film Institute. He directed Huling Dalaw in Eks (X).
 Shengka Mangahas worked as a writer and segment producer for MGM Advertising. She also worked as Events Production and Marketing Manager for Circuit Asia Events. She directed Magwayen's 1st stage play, Hawla, and the two stagings of Bidasari. She is currently an English Teacher for IECC and a student in Every Nation Leadership Institute. She directed Alas-tres.

References

External links
 PLM Official University website
 PLM Official Student Publication website
  Magwayen Geocities site
 Love-epic 'Indrapura' on-stage
 X (Eks) to be staged at Pamantasan ng Lungsod ng Maynila
  PLM Geocities site
 Association of South East Asian Institutes of Learning
 Wikipedia Map

Theater companies in Metro Manila
Pamantasan ng Lungsod ng Maynila